The 2023 European Wrestling Championships will held be from 17 to 23 April 2023 in Zagreb, Croatia.

Medal overview

Men's freestyle

Men's Greco-Roman

Women's freestyle

References

External links 
 UWW Database

 
Europe
European Wrestling Championships
International wrestling competitions hosted by Croatia
Sports competitions in Zagreb
European Wrestling Championships
Wrestling
European Wrestling Championships
Wrestling